The 1972 United States presidential election in Mississippi was held on November 7, 1972. Incumbent President Nixon won the state of Mississippi with 78.20% of the vote, his most overwhelming dominance in any of the fifty states, carrying the Magnolia State's seven electoral votes. Nixon defeated McGovern by a whopping margin of 58.57%, a margin never equalled in any state since and exceeded by any Republican nominee in the party's history only five times. This also marked the first time since 1944 that the state was on the winning side of the presidential election.

In Mississippi, voters voted for electors individually instead of as a slate, as in the other states.

McGovern carried only three counties – Claiborne, Holmes and Jefferson – all of which have overwhelming majority black populations. In archconservative Mississippi, McGovern was universally viewed as a left-wing extremist because of his support for busing and civil rights, plus his opposition to the Vietnam War, support for granting amnesty to draft dodgers and support for a thousand-dollar giveaway to each American as a solution to poverty. Many, especially Republican campaigners, also believed McGovern would legalize abortion and illicit drugs if he were elected – despite the fact that his running mate Sargent Shriver was firmly opposed to abortion rights.

Consequently, the proportion of white voters supporting McGovern was utterly negligible, and even the newly enfranchised and loyally Democratic African-American population did not universally accept McGovern's ideas, with the result that for the second time in three elections one of the historically strongest members of the former Democratic Solid South became the most Republican state in the nation. Even in a massive landslide, Mississippi voted 34% more Republican than the nation at-large. , this is the last election in which the following counties voted for a Republican presidential candidate: Marshall, Quitman, Bolivar, Sharkey, Wilkinson, Humphreys, Coahoma, Noxubee, and Tunica. This is also the last presidential election in which one of the two major-party nominees received less than 20% of the vote in a state. Nixon's margin of victory in Mississippi even exceeded McGovern's 56-point win in the District of Columbia, making this one of only two presidential elections in history (the other being the 1964 election, also in Mississippi) in which any state was decided by a larger margin than the District of Columbia.

Results

Results by county

Notes

References

Mississippi
1972
1972 Mississippi elections